Whitemouth Bog Wildlife Management Area is a wildlife management area that lies on either side of the Whitemouth Bog Ecological Reserve, Manitoba, Canada. It was established in 2009 under the Manitoba Wildlife Act.

See also
 List of wildlife management areas in Manitoba
 List of protected areas of Manitoba

References

External links
 Whitemouth Bog Wildlife Management Area
 iNaturalist: Whitemouth Bog Wildlife Management Area

Protected areas established in 2009
Wildlife management areas of Manitoba
Protected areas of Manitoba

Eastman Region, Manitoba